Málaga-Costa del Sol is one of the nine comarcas into which the province of Málaga is divided and is the second most populated comarca in the autonomous community of Andalusia.

Geography 
The region occupies part of the lower valley of the Guadalhorce River, the Hoya de Málaga and a large part of the Montes de Málaga. The landscape is covered by fields of orange, lemon and cane trees dotted with farmhouses, which gradually give way to industrial buildings on the outskirts of the city.

The mountains are covered with almond, olive and holm oak trees and are cut by narrow valleys excavated by torrential rivers such as the Guadalmedina that end at the bay of Malaga.

See also 

 Comarcas of Andalusia

References 

Comarcas of Andalusia
Province of Málaga
Populated places in the Province of Málaga